The 2017 Thai League 3 (known as the Euro Cake League Pro for sponsorship reasons) football season will be the first season of Thai League 3. 29 clubs will be divided into 2 groups (regions).

Clubs

Upper Region

Promoted from 2016 Regional League Division 2 Northern Division
 Kamphaeng Phet
 Phrae United
 Phayao
 Lamphun Warrior

Promoted from 2016 Regional League Division 2 North-Eastern Region
 Udon Thani
 Ubon Ratchathani
 Kalasin
 Khon Kaen
 Amnat Poly United

Promoted from 2016 Regional League Division 2 Eastern Region
 Cha Choeng Sao
 Prachinburi United
 Sa Kaeo

Promoted from 2016 Regional League Division 2 Central Region
 Ayutthaya Warrior
 Ayutthaya
 Singburi Bang Rachan
 Ayutthaya United

Lower Region

Promoted from 2016 Regional League Division 2 Bangkok & field Region
 Chamchuri United
 BU.Deffo
 Royal Thai Army

Promoted from 2016 Regional League Division 2 Bangkok & Eastern Region
 Raj Pracha
 Customs United
 Banbung United
 Kasem Bundit University

Promoted from 2016 Regional League Division 2 Western Region
 Samut Sakhon
 Krung Thonburi
 Ratchaphruek University
 Simork
 BTU United

Promoted from 2016 Regional League Division 2 Southern Region
 Surat Thani
 Nara United
 Trang
 Ranong United

Changes from last season

Changed clubs
 Ayutthaya Warrior was reinstated to Phichit.

Changed name
 Ratchaphruek University  changed to  Nakhon Si Thammarat Unity.

Withdrawn clubs
 Prachinburi United and BTU United have withdrawn from the 2017 campaign due to club licensing problems.
 Phichit

2017 Thai League 3 locations

Stadium and locations (Upper Region)

Stadium and locations (Lower Region)

Results

League table (Upper Region)

League table (Lower Region)

Third place play-off
This round was featured by Udon Thani, the second place of 2017 Thai League 3 Upper Region and Trang, the second place of 2017 Thai League 3 Lower Region. Winners of third place play-off would promoted to 2018 Thai League 2.

Summary

Matches

3–3 on aggregate. Udon Thani won on away goals.

Final
This round was featured by Khonkaen, the first place of 2017 Thai League 3 Upper Region and Samut Sakhon, the first place of 2017 Thai League 3 Lower Region. Both winners and runners-up would promoted to 2018 Thai League 2 automatically.

Summary

Matches

Samut Sakhon won 5–2 on aggregate.

See also
 2017 Thai League
 2017 Thai League 2
 2017 Thai League 4
 2017 Thailand Amateur League
 2017 Thai FA Cup
 2017 Thai League Cup
 2017 Thailand Champions Cup
 2017 Thai League 3 Upper Region
 2017 Thai League 3 Lower Region

References

Thai League 3
2017 in Thai football leagues